Chemokine (C-C motif) ligand 16 (CCL16) is a small cytokine belonging to the CC chemokine family that is known under several pseudonyms, including Liver-expressed chemokine (LEC) and Monotactin-1 (MTN-1).  This chemokine is expressed by the liver, thymus, and spleen and is chemoattractive for monocytes and lymphocytes. Cellular expression of CCL16 can be strongly induced in monocytes by IL-10, IFN-γ and bacterial lipopolysaccharide. Its gene is located on chromosome 17, in humans, among a cluster of other CC chemokines. CCL16 elicits its effects on cells by interacting with cell surface chemokine receptors such as CCR1, CCR2, CCR5 and CCR8.

C-C motif chemokine ligand 16 has been found in high levels in the blood plasma of humans.
CCL16 may be useful for trafficking eosinophils. This ligand has been found to have a functional affinity for H4 receptors that are expressed by eosinophils and mast cells. 
This chemokine has been shown to suppress rapid proliferation of myeloid progenitor cells.

References

Cytokines